Gunnar Aase (born 29 September 1971) is a retired football player from Norway.

He played for Viking FK in the Norwegian Premier League from 1990 to 2000. In 1991 Viking with Aase on the team won the Premier League. He retired after the 2000 season which ended with a loss in the Norwegian Football Cup Final and a conflict with the club who wanted to reduce his salary. Aase was also a prolific youth international.

In 2003, he coached Sola FK together with Børre Meinseth.

References

1971 births
Living people
Norwegian footballers
Viking FK players
Norway youth international footballers
Norway under-21 international footballers
Norway international footballers

Eliteserien players

Association football midfielders